Gerda Ryti ( Serlachius; 11 October 1886 — 8 September 1984) was the wife of Finland's fifth president, Risto Ryti, serving as the First Lady of Finland from 1940 until 1944.

Gerda Paula Serlachius was born as the second child to Senator and Justice Counselor (Oikeusneuvos)  and Paula  Söderhjelm.

She received her primary and secondary education in her native Swedish. She went on to study German language, literature and history of art at a university in Dresden, Germany, and later English language in London.

In 1916, she married her brother's business partner, the lawyer and politician, and future President of Finland, Risto Ryti. The couple had three children.

Her cultured upbringing, education and excellent language skills (she spoke five languages fluently) came useful in her role as the wife of Risto Ryti, in his high profile positions as the Governor of the Bank of Finland, later as the Prime Minister, and finally President. She was known as a hardworking First Lady, who supported her husband during his wartime premiership and presidency, and the war's difficult aftermath.

Her personal interests included parapsychology, which she had studied while in the UK, as well as spiritualism.

References

External links
1976 interview of Gerda Ryti on YLE website (in Finnish)

First ladies and gentlemen of Finland
Swedish-speaking Finns
People from Viipuri Province (Grand Duchy of Finland)
1886 births
1984 deaths
Parapsychologists